The Standards Institution of Israel (SII) (Hebrew: מכון התקנים הישראלי, Makhon haTkanim haIsraeli), known in Hebrew as "Mati," is a state-owned corporation responsible for setting standards for products and services provided in Israel. The Standards Institution tests and certifies products, granting a "standards mark" (tav teken). It also verifies that certified products maintain their quality over time.

History
The Standards Institution was established in 1945 by the Society of Engineers and Architects. It was registered as a company and independently set its standards, conducting quality testing and conducting surveys and studies. It was an outgrowth of the Materials Testing Laboratory established in 1923 to check the quality of building materials. Only 30 years after launching the laboratory in 1953, the Institution was legally acknowledged as the supreme authority for setting Israeli standards in keeping with the Law of Standards (1953). The offices of the Standards Institution are located in the Ramat Aviv district of Tel Aviv, near  Tel Aviv University.

Its primary task is determining standards and enforcing them. The Institution ensures quality control, does international market surveys, and conducts extensive studies about markets for various products.

Administration 
SII chairman - Former Knesset member Ran Cohen
CEO - Daniel Goldshtein
Director, Industry division - Yakov Vechtel
Director, Quality & Certification Division (QCD) - Eli Cohen-Kagan
Director, standardizations - Helen Atarot

See also
Economy of Israel

References

External links 

 

Organizations established in 1945
Government agencies of Israel
Standards organizations in Israel
Israel